Jayasundara Ranasinghe Mudiyanselage Vikum Sanjaya Bandara, popularly as Vikum Sanjaya (born 10 February 1992), is a professional Sri Lankan cricketer, who plays Twenty20 Internationals.

Domestic career
He made his first-class debut for Colombo Cricket Club in the 2011–12 Premier Trophy on 20 January 2012.

In April 2018, he was named in Colombo's squad for the 2018 Super Provincial One Day Tournament. In August 2018, he was named in Dambulla's squad the 2018 SLC T20 League.

International career
In December 2016 he was added to Sri Lanka's Test squad for their series against South Africa. In January 2017 he was added to Sri Lanka's One Day International (ODI) squad for their series, also against South Africa.

He made his Twenty20 International (T20I) debut for Sri Lanka against Australia at the Melbourne Cricket Ground on 17 February 2017. He took his first international wicket by dismissing Moisés Henriques for 17 runs.

References

External links
 

1992 births
Living people
Sri Lankan cricketers
Sri Lanka Twenty20 International cricketers
Badureliya Sports Club cricketers
Burgher Recreation Club cricketers
Colombo Cricket Club cricketers
Cricketers from Colombo
Nugegoda Sports and Welfare Club cricketers
Saracens Sports Club cricketers